The judicial system of Vietnam is governed under the Constitution of Vietnam, the Law on the Organization of People's Courts (2014), and the Law on the Organization of People's Procuracies (2014). Since Vietnam is a one-party socialist republic, the judiciary falls under the leadership of the Communist Party of Vietnam, and judges and procurators are all members of the Party. The judiciary is nominally accountable to the National Assembly of Vietnam, which is the highest institution of government power in the country.

Structure
The judicial system of Vietnam comprises the "people's courts," military tribunals, and people's procuracies.

The highest court in the country is the Supreme People's Court. Underneath the Supreme People's Court are three levels of courts: the superior people's courts (toà án nhân dân cấp cao), of which there are three; the provincial-level people's courts (toà án nhân dân cấp tỉnh), of which there are 63; and district-level people's courts (toà án nhân dân cấp huyện), which is the lowest level. The superior courts are appellate courts based in Hanoi, Danang, and Ho Chi Minh City, each responsible for the northern, central, and southern region of the country, respectively. Provincial and municipal courts are both trial courts and appellate courts, while district courts are trial courts. There are military tribunals established at various levels in the Vietnam People's Army, the highest one being the Central Military Tribunal, which is subordinate to the Supreme People's Court. The Supreme People's Court is headed by the Chief Justice of the Supreme People's Court (Chánh án Toà án nhân dân tối cao), who is appointed by the National Assembly of Vietnam.

The people's procuracies (also known as the people's office of inspection and supervision, viện kiểm sát nhân dân) serve as the prosecutorial authority in Vietnam. They also have the responsibility to supervise and inspect judicial compliance by government agencies and officials. There is a people's procuracy for every people's court, and the military has its own military procuracies. The highest procuracy is the Supreme People's Procuracy (Viện Kiểm sát nhân dân tối cao), headed by the Chief Procurator of the Supreme People's Procuracy (Viện trưởng Viện Kiểm sát nhân dân tối cao), who is appointed by the National Assembly.

Criticisms
Although the constitution provides for independent judges and lay assessors (who lack administrative training), the U.S. Department of State maintains that Vietnam lacks an independent judiciary, in part because the Communist Party of Vietnam selects judges and vets them for political reliability. Moreover, the party seeks to influence the outcome of cases involving perceived threats to the state or the party's dominant position.

In an effort to increase judicial independence, the government transferred local courts from the Ministry of Justice to the Supreme People's Court in September 2002. However, the Department of State saw no evidence that the move actually achieved the stated goal. Vietnam's judiciary also is hampered by a shortage of lawyers and rudimentary trial procedures.

Death penalty
The death penalty often is imposed in cases of corruption and drug trafficking. As of February 2014, the death penalty remains a punishment that can be applied to those who have been found guilty of criminal activity. In January 2014, a court in northern Vietnam sentenced 30 Vietnamese citizens to death after they were found guilty of heroin trafficking—the largest number of defendants sentenced to death in a single trial in the country's legal history. At the same time, there are around 700 people awaiting on death row in Vietnam. The January 2014 decision received condemnation from numerous international organizations, such as the World Coalition Against the Death Penalty.

References